A feria (fair in English) is an annual local festival in Spain and southern France, characterized by bullfights, bull running in the streets, bodegas (outdoor bars or cellars with festive music) and bandas. The word festayre (from the Gascon hestaire) means ferias' partiers.

Introduction

In Spain 
The Spanish word feria originally designates  a fair (agricultural, books, ...). Bullfights are often given on the occasion of fairs, so the Spaniards came to designate by the term "fair" a series of bullfightings organized on this occasion, and often - especially in Andalusia - the festivities that accompany these bullfights. In many parts of Spain, there are nevertheless still a parting between the festivities and the feria which takes place on this occasion. Thus, in Pamplona, one differentiates the San Fermín (Fiestas de San Fermín or Sanfermines) of the Feria del Toro, which means the eight bullfights cycle, a novillada and a bullfight on horseback proposed for the festivities. Thus, festivities without taurine activities cannot be termed ferias.

The word continues to be used in Spain with exactly the same meaning as the English "fair." Just a look at the calendarios de ferias of all the Spanish regions to note that the majority of them have no bullfights.

One of Spain's most famous ferias is the Feria de abril  (April Fair) of Seville. During this feria, the city hosts not only bullfights, but hundreds of casetas (private party tents) with flamenco dancing, and a large modern fairground with rides and Ferris Wheel and food courts selling paella, manzanilla, and grilled meats. The streets come alive with horses and horse carriages bearing locals in traditional Andalusian costume.

Other notable ferias take place each year in Malaga in August and in Cordoba in May.

In France 
In France, the word was often used to refer to a series of bullfights. In the southwestern and southeastern parts of France, people quickly confounded taurine feria and festival. Gascon towns have organized this movement over the past forty years. Thus, the Fêtes de  Dax, officially became the Feria de Dax, thus breaking with the Spanish meaning and tradition. The popularity of these feasts and the media coverage that was made favored the substitution of the word fêtes by feria. Many municipalities - including those who hold no bullfight - as well have renamed their annual patron saint's festivals into ferias. And current usage followed. However, in Mont-de-Marsan as in Bayonne, the summer festive week continues to be called respectively Fêtes de la Madeleine and Fêtes de Bayonne. The feria de Nîmes (Pentecost Feria and Harvest Feria) are currently the largest ferias in France. The Pentecost Feria attracts nearly a million visitors over six days.

The main ferias of France
 South East region:
 Alès 
 Feria d'Arles 
 Beaucaire
 Béziers 
 Carcassonne
 Céret
 Châteaurenard
 Collioure
 Istres
 Lunel
 Millas
 Mauguio
 Nîmes
 Palavas-les-Flots
 Pézilla-la-Rivière
 Saint-Gilles
 Saintes-Maries-de-la-Mer
 Vauvert
 Gascony:
 Aire-sur-Adour
 Amou
 Arzacq-Arraziguet
 Bayonne 
 Dax
 Eauze 
 Floirac
 Hagetmau
 Mimizan
 Mont-de-Marsan 
 Orthez
 Pomarez
 Saint-Vincent-de-Tyrosse
 Vic-Fezensac
 Condom
 Saint-Sever
 Ondres
 Parentis-en-Born

References 

Bullfighting
Bull sports
Festivals in France
Festivals in Spain
Annual events in France
Annual events in Spain